Eileen Sheridan may refer to:

Eileen Sheridan (model) (1936–2018), British beauty pageant contestant
Eileen Sheridan (cyclist) (1923–2023), English cyclist